Glaucostola binotata is a moth of the family Erebidae first described by William Schaus in 1905. It is found in French Guiana, Suriname, Guyana, Ecuador and Peru.

References

Phaegopterina
Moths described in 1905